Sirsanai, also spelt Sarsinai, is a village in the Khyber Pakhtunkhwa province of Pakistan. It is located at 34°49'0N 72°17'0E with an altitude of 911 metres (2992 feet). Neighbouring settlements include Khemdarra and Kabbal.

References

Villages in Khyber Pakhtunkhwa